Voltage Inc (ボルテージ) is a Japanese developer and publisher of interactive story apps, such as visual novels and otome games, for iOS and Android devices. They also previously developed games with their San Francisco based subsidiary Voltage Entertainment USA.

History
The company originated in 1999, based in Tokyo, and began to expand to English-speaking audiences in 2011, releasing English-language versions of their games through the Apple Store and Google Play. They went on to establish a US subsidiary company, Voltage Entertainment USA, in 2012. Expanded versions of several of their games were previously released through GREE, however support for the GREE platform ceased in 2014.

Voltage's American subsidiary, Voltage Entertainment USA, have released adaptations of existing Voltage games which have been localized to appeal to Western audiences. Beginning in 2013 the subsidiary began producing original games marketed directly to their English-speaking audience. By 2014 it was reported that Voltage had an audience of 22 million across all its games. In 2017, Voltage Entertainment USA launched the multi-series app Lovestruck: Choose Your Romance and transitioned its AmeMix series into the app. In July 2020, Voltage Entertainment USA's writing staff went on strike and won increased wages and greater workplace transparency.

In December 2021, Voltage announced they would be shutting down Voltage Entertainment USA in 2022 to allocate resources more efficiently.

Games

Voltage Entertainment USA

Adaptations

Original titles

Augmented & Virtual Reality 
On January 13, 2017, Voltage Inc. released their first augmented reality title made available to users through the App Store and Google Play, entitled “Let’s Snuggle! AR”. The app is a unique first edition to the company's game portfolio, permitting fans of the Visual Novel romance apps to interact and talk with popular characters in a more personal setting. Following the release and success of the augmented reality app, Voltage Inc. created Voltage VR Inc., a subsidiary of Voltage Inc., dedicated to ensuring and providing fans high quality AR and VR games in the future.

Notes

References

External links
 
 https://www.voltage-ent.com
 Lovestruck: Choose Your Romance

Mass media companies of Japan
Japanese companies established in 1999
Mass media in Tokyo
Internet technology companies of Japan